Events from the year 1814 in Sweden

Incumbents
 Monarch – Charles XIII

Events
 - Swedish–Norwegian War (1814)
 - Battle of Kjølberg Bridge
 - Convention of Moss
 - H. M. The King's Medal
 - Treaty of Kiel
 - Poem Gefion, skaldedikt i fyra sånger by Eleonora Charlotta d'Albedyhll

Births
 16 January – Henning Hamilton, politician (died 1886)
 13 August - Anders Jonas Ångström, physicist (died 1874)
 22 May – Amalia Lindegren, painter  (died 1891)
 3 September – Mathilda Gelhaar, opera singer (died 1889)
 1 October  –  Josefina Deland, women's right activist (died 1891)
 Unknown date – Pilt Carin Ersdotter, famous beauty (died 1885)
 Antoinette Nording, perfume entrepreneur (died 1887)
Vilhelm Pettersson, ballet dancer (died 1854)
Lovisa Mathilda Nettelbladt, writer (died 1867)

Deaths
 26 February – Johan Tobias Sergel, sculptor (born 1740)
 - Georg Johan De Besche, royal favorite (born 1754)
 - Gustaf Mauritz Armfelt, royal favorite (born 1757)
 - Nils Henric Liljensparre, police officer (born 1738)

References

 
Years of the 19th century in Sweden
Sweden